Naḥal Sorek, also Soreq, is one of the largest, most important drainage basins in the Judean Hills. It is mentioned in the Book of Judges 16:4 of the Bible as the border between the ancient Philistines and the Tribe of Dan of the ancient Israelites. It is known in Arabic as Wadi es-Sarār, sometimes spelled Surar, and by various names along different segments, such as Wadi Qalunya near Motza, Wadi al-Tahuna, and Nahr Rubin further downstream.

Etymology
Folk etymology mentioned in the Midrash (Numbers Rabbah 9) states that the sorek is a "fruitless tree" (the word   means "empty" in Hebrew), implying a moral lesson and metaphor suggesting that Samson's involvement in his affair with Delilah was eventually "fruitless". 

Etymology suggests that "sorek" means "special vine" and refers to the grapes and wines grown in the area.

In the Bible
Nahal Sorek was the place where Delilah lived, and Samson came to meet her for the first time. It was also the place she enticed him to tell her the secret of his strength, and where he was eventually captured by the Philistines:

Land property along the river
In 1921, lands that bounded Nahal Sorek which passed to the south of Artuf were designated as "Mara land," meaning, pasture land reserved primarily for the use of the adjoining villages.

Road and railway

In the 19th century, Nahal Sorek served as an important connection between the two major cities in the area, Jaffa and Jerusalem. Because railways at the time were reliant on water sources, several surveyors who planned the first railway in the Middle East, the Jaffa–Jerusalem line, decided to use Nahal Sorek as the main route for the line. The line was inaugurated in 1892, following Nahal Sorek until its junction with the Valley of Rephaim, after which it follows the Valley of Rephaim into Jerusalem. While the Tel Aviv-to-Jerusalem high-speed railway line is designed to avoid the Nahal Sorek route and shorten the line, the older railway along Nahal Sorek has been refurbished and remains in use. It connects the country's two largest cities and its main international airport, running in a westerly-easterly direction between Tel Aviv, Ben Gurion International Airport, Lod, Ramla, Beit Shemesh and Jerusalem. However, today the rail line mainly serves as a scenic route used by tourists. Several small water reservoirs exist along its route, notably near Tal Shahar and Yesodot. Waterfalls are located on several of its tributaries, including Ayanot Dekalim in Beit Shemesh, Ein Sifla on Nahal HaMe'ara, and others.

Nature Reserve
The Nahal Sorek Nature Reserve, first declared in 1965, and since expanded, spans over 11000 dunams, from the Avshalom Cave Nature Reserve near Beit Shemesh, to moshav Nes Harim.

Desalination plants
Near the mouth of the Sorek River are two large seawater desalination plants, Palmachim and Sorek, the latter being, when used at full capacity, the largest of its kind in the world (as of 2013).

Gallery

See also
 Nahal Sorek Regional Council, administrative district in central Israel situated along Sorek Valley
 Soreq Nuclear Research Center, a research and development institute
 Timnah, Philistine city mentioned in the Bible, identified with Tel Batash in the Sorek Valley
 Zorah, biblical town in Judah, identified with a site overlooking the Sorek Valley

References

Hebrew Bible rivers
Rivers of Israel
Geography of Israel